In Greek mythology, Catreus or Katreus was the eldest son of Minos and Pasiphaë, and Minos' successor as king of Crete. Catreus had one son, Althaemenes, and three daughters, Apemosyne, Aerope and Clymene. Catreus was mistakenly killed by his son Althaemenes thereby fulfilling an oracle's prophecy.

Mythology 

According to Apollodorus' account, an oracle told Catreus that one of his children would kill him. Although Catreus kept the prophecy secret, his son Althaemenes found out, and fearing that he would be the one to kill his father, took his sister Apemosyne and left Crete for Rhodes. Catreus gave his other daughters to Nauplius to be sold off in foreign lands, and Aerope married Pleisthenes (or Atreus), but Nauplius kept  Clymene for himself as wife. Years later, as an old man Catreus sailed the seas searching for his son, so that he could pass on his kingship to him. His ship stopped at Rhodes and was mistaken by some cowherds for a pirate ship. Catreus tried to explain who he was, but could not be heard above the barking of the cowherds' dogs. Althaemenes arrived and killed his father with his javelin, thus fulfilling the prophecy. When Althaemenes realized what he had done, Althaemenes prayed and was swallowed up by a chasm in the ground.

Diodorus Siculus, gives a slightly different version of the story, saying that an oracle had been given to Althaemenes which said that he was destined to kill his father. Another tradition involving Catreus' daughter Aerope, followed by Euripides in his lost play  Kressai, and possibly by Sophocles in his play Ajax, was that Catreus found Aerope in bed with a slave and sent her to Nauplius to be drowned.

Catreus, an ancient Cretan city mentioned by the second-century Greek geographer Pausanias, was apparently supposed by the Cretans to have been founded by Catreus. According to Apollodorus, Catreus' grandson Menelaus (Aerope's son) was away in Crete, presiding at Catreus' funeral, when Paris took Helen to Troy.

Parallel story 
The story of Catreus shares similarities with stories told about Aleus, king of Tegea. In these stories, Aleus received an oracle that his grandson would kill Aleus' sons, so Aleus took measures to keep his daughter Auge a virgin, nevertheless Auge became pregnant (by Heracles) and Aleus (as did Catreus) gives his daughter to Nauplius, to be drowned but instead Nauplius sold her to the Mysian king Tethras, who adopts her son Telephus, as his heir. As an adult Telephus returns to Tegea and unknowingly kills his uncles.

Notes

References
 Apollodorus, Apollodorus, The Library, with an English Translation by Sir James George Frazer, F.B.A., F.R.S. in 2 Volumes. Cambridge, Massachusetts, Harvard University Press; London, William Heinemann Ltd. 1921. Online version at the Perseus Digital Library.
 Collard, Christopher and Martin Cropp (2008a), Euripides Fragments: Aegeus–Meleanger,  Loeb Classical Library No. 504. Cambridge, Massachusetts: Harvard University Press, 2008. . Online version at Harvard University Press.
 Diodorus Siculus, Diodorus Siculus: The Library of History. Translated by C. H. Oldfather. Twelve volumes. Loeb Classical Library. Cambridge, Massachusetts: Harvard University Press; London: William Heinemann, Ltd. 1989. Online version by Bill Thayer
 Gantz, Timothy, Early Greek Myth: A Guide to Literary and Artistic Sources, Johns Hopkins University Press, 1996, Two volumes:  (Vol. 1),  (Vol. 2).
 Garagin, M., P. Woodruff, Early Greek Political thought from Homer to the Sophists, Cambridge 1995. .
 Grimal, Pierre, The Dictionary of Classical Mythology, Wiley-Blackwell, 1996. .
 Hard, Robin, The Routledge Handbook of Greek Mythology: Based on H.J. Rose's "Handbook of Greek Mythology", Psychology Press, 2004, . Google Books.
 Pausanias, Pausanias Description of Greece with an English Translation by W.H.S. Jones, Litt.D., and H.A. Ormerod, M.A., in 4 Volumes. Cambridge, Massachusetts, Harvard University Press; London, William Heinemann Ltd. 1918. Online version at the Perseus Digital Library.
 Sophocles, The Ajax of Sophocles. Edited with introduction and notes by Sir Richard Jebb, Sir Richard Jebb. Cambridge. Cambridge University Press. 1893 Online version at the Perseus Digital Library
 Smith, William; Dictionary of Greek and Roman Biography and Mythology, London (1873). Online version at the Perseus Digital Library.
 Tripp, Edward, Crowell's Handbook of Classical Mythology, Thomas Y. Crowell Co; First edition (June 1970). .
 Webster, Thomas Bertram Lonsdale, The Tragedies of Euripides, Methuen & Co, 1967 .
Princes in Greek mythology
Kings of Crete
Kings in Greek mythology
Rhodian mythology
Deaths by javelin
Cretan characters in Greek mythology